Blevins Store is an unincorporated community in northwestern Surry County, North Carolina, United States, located south of Ladonia.  The community is associated with the intersection of Blevins Store and Haystack Roads.

Unincorporated communities in Surry County, North Carolina
Unincorporated communities in North Carolina